Acanthaeschna victoria
Adversaeschna brevistyla
Aeschnophlebia anisoptera
Aeschnophlebia longistigma
Aeschnophlebia optata
Aeschnophlebia zygoptera
Aeshna affinis
Aeshna athalia
Aeshna baicalensis
Aeshna caerulea
Aeshna canadensis
Aeshna clepsydra
Aeshna constricta
Aeshna crenata
Aeshna cyanea
Aeshna ellioti
Aeshna eremita
Aeshna flavifrons
Aeshna frontalis
Aeshna grandis
Aeshna interrupta
Aeshna juncea
Aeshna lucia
Aeshna meruensis
Aeshna minuscula
Aeshna mixta
Aeshna moori
Aeshna nigroflava
Aeshna osiliensis
Aeshna palmata
Aeshna persephone
Aeshna petalura
Aeshna riley
Aeshna scotias
Aeshna septentrionalis
Aeshna serrata
Aeshna sitchensis
Aeshna subarctica
Aeshna subpupillata
Aeshna tuberculifera
Aeshna umbrosa
Aeshna undulata
Aeshna verticalis
Aeshna viridis
Aeshna walkeri
Aeshna wiliamsoniana
Aeshna wittei
Aeshna yemenensis
Agyrtacantha dirupta
Agyrtacantha microstigma
Agyrtacantha othello
Agyrtacantha tumidula
Allopetalia pustuloso
Allopetalia reticulosa
Amphiaeschna ampla
Anaciaeschna donaldi
Anaciaeschna isosceles
Anaciaeschna jaspidea
Anaciaeschna kashimirensis
Anaciaeschna martini
Anaciaeschna megalopis
Anaciaeschna melanostoma
Anaciaeschna moluccana
Anaciaeschna montivagans
Anaciaeschna triangulifera
Anax amazili
Anax bacchus
Anax bangweuluensis
Anax chloromelas
Anax concolor
Anax congoliath
Anax ephippiger
Anax fumosus
Anax georgius
Anax gibbosulus
Anax guttatus
Anax immaculifrons
Anax imperator
Anax indicus
Anax julius
Anax junius
Anax longipes
Anax maclachlani
Anax mandrakae
Anax marginope
Anax nigrofasciatus
Anax panybeus
Anax parthenope
Anax piraticus
Anax pugnax
Anax selysi
Anax speratus
Anax strenuus
Anax tristis
Anax tumorifer
Anax walsinghami
Andaeschna andresi
Andaeschna rufipes
Andaeschna timotocuica
Andaeschna unicolor
Antipodophlebia asthenes
Austroaeschna anacantha
Austroaeschna atrata
Austroaeschna christine
Austroaeschna cooloola
Austroaeschna eungella
Austroaeschna flavomaculata
Austroaeschna forcipata
Austroaeschna hardyi
Austroaeschna inermis
Austroaeschna ingrid
Austroaeschna muelleri
Austroaeschna obscura
Austroaeschna parvistigma
Austroaeschna pulchra
Austroaeschna sigma
Austroaeschna speciosa
Austroaeschna subapicalis
Austroaeschna tasmanica
Austroaeschna unicornis
Austroaeschna weiskei
Austrogynacantha heterogena
Austrophlebia costalis
Austrophlebia subcostalis
Basiaeschna janata
Boyeria cretensis
Boyeria grafiana
Boyeria irene
Boyeria maclachlani
Boyeria sinensis
Boyeria vinosa
Brachytron pratense
Caliaeschna microstigma
Castoraeschna caster
Castoraeschna colorata
Castoraeschna coronata
Castoraeschna decurvata
Castoraeschna januaria
Castoraeschna longfieldae
Castoraeschna margarethae
Castoraeschna tepuica
Cephalaeschna acutifrons
Cephalaeschna aritai
Cephalaeschna chaoi
Cephalaeschna dinghuensis
Cephalaeschna klapperichi
Cephalaeschna klotsi
Cephalaeschna masoni
Cephalaeschna needhami
Cephalaeschna obversa
Cephalaeschna orbifrons
Cephalaeschna patrorum
Cephalaeschna risi
Cephalaeschna shaowuensis
Cephalaeschna triadica
Cephalaeschna viridifrons
Coryphaeschna adnexa
Coryphaeschna amazonica
Coryphaeschna apeora
Coryphaeschna diapyra
Coryphaeschna huaorania
Coryphaeschna ingens
Coryphaeschna perrensi
Coryphaeschna viriditas
Dendroaeschna conspersa
Epiaeschna heros
Gomphaeschna antilope
Gomphaeschna furcillata
Gynacantha adela
Gynacantha africana
Gynacantha albistyla
Gynacantha alcanthoe
Gynacantha apiaensis
Gynacantha apicalis
Gynacantha arnaudi
Gynacantha arsinoe
Gynacantha arthuri
Gynacantha auricularis
Gynacantha bainbriggei
Gynacantha bartai
Gynacantha basiguttata
Gynacantha bayadera
Gynacantha bifida
Gynacantha biharica
Gynacantha bispina
Gynacantha bullata
Gynacantha burmana
Gynacantha calliope
Gynacantha calypso
Gynacantha caudata
Gynacantha chelifera
Gynacantha constricta
Gynacantha convergens
Gynacantha corbeti
Gynacantha croceipennis
Gynacantha cylindrata
Gynacantha demeter
Gynacantha dobsoni
Gynacantha dohrni
Gynacantha dravida
Gynacantha ereagris
Gynacantha flavipes
Gynacantha francesca
Gynacantha furcata
Gynacantha gracilis
Gynacantha helenga
Gynacantha hova
Gynacantha hyalina
Gynacantha immaculifrons
Gynacantha incisura
Gynacantha interioris
Gynacantha japonica
Gynacantha jessei
Gynacantha jubilaris
Gynacantha khasiaca
Gynacantha kirbyi
Gynacantha klagesi
Gynacantha laticeps
Gynacantha limbalis
Gynacantha litoralis
Gynacantha maclachlani
Gynacantha malgassica
Gynacantha manderica
Gynacantha membranalis
Gynacantha mexicana
Gynacantha mocsaryi
Gynacantha musa
Gynacantha nausicaa
Gynacantha nervosa
Gynacantha nigeriensis
Gynacantha nourlangie
Gynacantha nympha
Gynacantha ochraceipes
Gynacantha odoneli
Gynacantha pasiphae
Gynacantha penelope
Gynacantha phaeomeria
Gynacantha radama
Gynacantha rammohani
Gynacantha remartinia
Gynacantha risi
Gynacantha rolandmuelleri
Gynacantha rosenbergi
Gynacantha rotundata
Gynacantha ryukyuensis
Gynacantha salatrix
Gynacantha sevastopuloi
Gynacantha sextans
Gynacantha stenoptera
Gynacantha stevensoni
Gynacantha stylata
Gynacantha subinterrupta
Gynacantha tenuis
Gynacantha tibiata
Gynacantha usambarica
Gynacantha vesiculata
Gynacantha victoriae
Gynacantha villosa
Gynacantha zuluensis
Gynacanthaeschna sikkima
Heliaeschna bartelsi
Heliaeschna crassa
Heliaeschna cynthiae
Heliaeschna filostyla
Heliaeschna fuliginosa
Heliaeschna idae
Heliaeschna lanceolata
Heliaeschna libyana
Heliaeschna longfieldae
Heliaeschna raymondi
Heliaeschna sembe
Heliaeschna simplicia
Heliaeschna trinervulata
Heliaeschna ugandica
Heliaeschna ukerewensis
Heliaeschna uniervula
Hemianax papuensis
Indaeschna baluga
Indaeschna grubaueri
Limnetron antarcticum
Limnetron debile
Linaeschna polli
Nasiaeschna pentacantha
Neuraeschna calverti
Neuraeschna capillata
Neuraeschna claviforcipata
Neuraeschna clavulata
Neuraeschna cornuta
Neuraeschna costalis
Neuraeschna dentigera
Neuraeschna harpya
Neuraeschna maxima
Neuraeschna maya
Neuraeschna mayoruna
Neuraeschna mina
Neuraeschna producta
Neuraeschna tapajonica
Neuraeschna titania
Notoaeschna geminata
Notaeschna sagittata
Oligoaeschna amata
Oligoaeschna andamani
Oligoaeschna buehri
Oligoaeschna decorata
Oligoaeschna elacatura
Oligoaeschna foliacea
Oligoaeschna khasiana
Oligoaeschna kunigamiensis
Oligoaeschna lieni
Oligoaeschna martini
Oligoaeschna modiglianii
Oligoaeschna mutata
Oligoaeschna niisatoi
Oligoaeschna petalura
Oligoaeschna platyura
Oligoaeschna poeciloptera
Oligoaeschna pramoti
Oligoaeschna pryeri
Oligoaeschna pseudosumatrana
Oligoaeschna pyanan
Oligoaeschna sabre
Oligoaeschna speciosa
Oligoaeschna sumatrana
Oligoaeschna tsaopiensis
Oligoaeschna uemurai
Oligoaeschna uropetala
Oligoaeschna venatrix
Oligoaeschna venusta
Oligoaeschna zambo
Oplonaeschna armata
Oplonaeschna magna
Oreaeschna dictatrix
Oreaeschna dominatrix
Periaeschna biguttata
Periaeschna flecheri
Periaeschna flinti
Periaeschna gerrhon
Periaeschna laidlawi
Periaeschna lebasi
Periaeschna magdalena
Periaeschna mira
Periaeschna nocturnalis
Periaeschna unifasciata
Periaeschna zhangzhouensis
Petaliaeschna corneliae
Petaliaeschna flavipes
Petaliaeschna fletcheri
Petaliaeschna lieftincki
Petaliaeschna pinratanai
Planaeschna celia
Planaeschna chiengmaiensis
Planaeschna cucphuongensis
Planaeschna haui
Planaeschna intersedens
Planaeschna ishigakiana
Planaeschna milnei
Planaeschna naica
Planaeschna nanlingensis
Planaeschna risi
Planaeschna skiaperipola
Planaeschna suichangensis
Planaeschna taiwana
Planaeschna tamdaoensis
Planaeschna tomokunii
Plattycantha acuta
Plattycantha cornuta
Plattycantha venatrix
Polycanthagyna chaoi
Polycanthagyna erythromelas
Polycanthagyna melanictera
Polycanthagyna ornithocephala
Racenaeschna angustistrigis
Remartinia luteipennis
Remartinia restricta
Remartinia rufipennis
Remartinia secreta
Rhionaeschna absoluta
Rhionaeschna biliosa
Rhionaeschna bonariensis
Rhionaeschna brasiliensis
Rhionaeschna brevicercia
Rhionaeschna brevifrons
Rhionaeschna californica
Rhionaeschna condor
Rhionaeschna confusa
Rhionaeschna cornigra
Rhionaeschna decessus
Rhionaeschna diffinis
Rhionaeschna draco
Rhionaeschna dugesi
Rhionaeschna eduardoi
Rhionaeschna elsia
Rhionaeschna fissifrons
Rhionaeschna galapagoensis
Rhionaeschna haarupi
Rhionaeschna intricata
Rhionaeschna itataia
Rhionaeschna jalapensis
Rhionaeschna joannisi
Rhionaeschna manni
Rhionaeschna marchali
Rhionaeschna multicolor
Rhionaeschna mutata
Rhionaeschna nubigena
Rhionaeschna obscura
Rhionaeschna pallipes
Rhionaeschna pauloi
Rhionaeschna peralta
Rhionaeschna planaltica
Rhionaeschna psilus
Rhionaeschna punctata
Rhionaeschna serrania
Rhionaeschna tinti
Rhionaeschna variegata
Rhionaeschna vazquezae
Rhionaeschna vigintipunctata
Sarasaeschna minuta
Spinaeschna tripunctata
Spinaeschna watsoni
Staurophlebia auca
Staurophlebia bosqui
Staurophlebia gigantula
Staurophlebia reticulata
Staurophlebia wayana
Subaeschna francesca
Telephlebia brevicauda
Telephlebia cyclops
Telephlebia godeffroyi
Telephlebia tillyardi
Telephlebia tryoni
Telephlebia undia
Tetracanthagyna bakeri
Tetracanthagyna brunnea
Tetracanthagyna degorsi
Tetracanthagyna plagiata
Tetracanthagyna waterhousei
Triacanthagyna caribbea
Triacanthagyna dentata
Triacanthagyna ditzleri
Triacanthagyna nympha
Triacanthagyna obscuripennis
Triacanthagyna satyrus
Triacanthagyna septima
Triacanthagyna trifida
Triacanthagyna williamsoni

L